John "Sonny" Askew (born April 17, 1957) is a retired American soccer forward who spent seven seasons in the North American Soccer League, two in the second American Soccer League, two in the third American Soccer League, and one in the Major Indoor Soccer League.  He also earned four caps with the United States men's national soccer team.

Youth
Askew grew up in Baltimore, Maryland where he was a Parade High School All-American soccer player at Patterson High School. He then attended and played soccer at Essex Community College. He was a 1976 NJCAA All-American. In 2005, he was inducted into the National Junior College Athletic Association Men's Soccer Hall of Fame for his time playing for Essex.

Professional
Askew joined the Washington Dips of the North American Soccer League for the 1977 season. He also played indoor for the Dips in early 1978. He continued to play outdoor for them through 1980 before moving to the Montreal Manic for the 1981 season. In 1981, he signed with the expansion Baltimore Blast of Major Indoor Soccer League, playing only one season of indoor soccer. In 1982, he moved to the Georgia Generals of the second American Soccer League, but was back in the NASL for the short-lived Team America in 1983. In 1984, the last year of the NASL's existence, he played for the Tampa Bay Rowdies.  With the collapse of the NASL following the 1984 season, Askew moved to the amateur Spartans of the Northern Virginia Soccer League.  In July 1987, Askew signed with F.C. Washington as the team prepared for the first season of the newly established American Soccer League in 1988.  By the beginning of the new league in the spring of 1988, the team had been renamed the Washington Stars.  Askew spent two seasons with the Stars.  He was a 1988 ASL All Star.

National team
Askew he earned four caps with the United States men's national soccer team.  His first was a 3–1 victory over Bermuda on July 10, 1979.  His last cap came in a 2–2 tie with Ecuador on February 12, 1984.

Coach
He coached the Essex Community College men's soccer team and was listed by Chicago Fire goalkeeper Zach Thornton as his most influential soccer figure.  He now coaches at Pipeline Soccer Club and is on the Board of Directors of the club as well.

He was inducted into Maryland Soccer Hall of Fame.

References

External links
NASL/MISL stats

1957 births
Living people
Soccer players from Baltimore
American Soccer League (1933–1983) players
American Soccer League (1988–89) players
American soccer coaches
American soccer players
American expatriate soccer players
Baltimore Blast (1980–1992) players
Georgia Generals players
Major Indoor Soccer League (1978–1992) players
Montreal Manic players
North American Soccer League (1968–1984) indoor players
North American Soccer League (1968–1984) players
Tampa Bay Rowdies (1975–1993) players
Team America (NASL) players
Washington Diplomats (NASL) players
Washington Stars players
United States men's international soccer players
Expatriate soccer players in Canada
Association football forwards
Community College of Baltimore County alumni